Clarisia is a genus of trees in the family Moraceae, native to North and South America (from Mexico to Bolivia).

Taxonomy 
The genus Clarisia contains the following species:
 Clarisia biflora Ruiz & Pav.
 Clarisia ilicifolia (Spreng.) Lanj. & Rossbach	
 Clarisia racemosa Ruiz & Pav.

References

Moraceae
Moraceae genera